The House of Coligny is an old French family, originating from the Bresse region of France. Their bloodline ended in 1694.

Titles
At various points in times, the House of Coligny held the following titles:
 seigneurs de Cuchet (Saint-Sorlin-en-Bugey)
 de Meillonnas
 de Saint-Denis
 de Varey (Saint-Jean-le-Vieux)

Members
Members of the family include:
Gaspard I de Coligny, comte de Coligny, seigneur de Châtillon (1465/1470–1522), known as the Marshal of Châtillon
Gaspard II de Coligny (1519–1572), Seigneur (Lord) de Châtillon, admiral of France and Protestant leader
François de Coligny (1557–1591), comte de Coligny and seigneur de Châtillon-sur-Loing, a Protestant general during the Wars of Religion
Gaspard III de Coligny (1584–1646), comte de Coligny and seigneur de Châtillon-sur-Loing, then duc de Coligny, marquis d'Andelot, Peer of France and Marshal of France (1622), a Protestant general
Odet de Coligny (1517–1571), French cardinal of Châtillon, bishop of Beauvais
François de Coligny d'Andelot (1521–1569), one of the leaders of French Protestantism during the French Wars of Religion
Jean de Coligny-Saligny (1617–1686), French nobleman and army commander

Family tree

 
French noble families